Iryna Dvoskina (born 22 December 1958)  is a Ukraine-born Australian athletics coach who works with Paralympic athletes.

Biography
Being an only child, she came to Australia in 2003 to be closer to her mother Fira (born 20 September 1934), who had moved to Australia in 1996. Her mother has carried on her successful coaching career in New South Wales.

She undertook a four-year coaching degree at university in Ukraine. She was the athletics coach with the Ukrainian Paralympic team from 1995 to 2002. In 2003, she was appointed sprints and jumps coach for Australian Institute of Sport Paralympic track and field athletes. She has been an athletics coach with the Australian team from 2004 Athens Paralympics to the 2020 Tokyo Paralympics.

Coaching Medals at Major Championships

She is regarded as a strict coach due to her intensive training six days a week, careful diets and her attention to detail. She has stated:"[My mother] is the biggest inspiration in my life ... maybe there is some genetics. I love my job and I am doing it with love. I love my guys." Her husband Yuriy Vdovychenko was  Paralympic Swimming Coach at the National Training Centre (NTC) in Canberra from 2013 to 2020.

Recognition
2008 - Australian Paralympic Committee Coach of the Year.
2016 - Australian Paralympic Committee Coach of the Year.
2022 - Medal (OAM) of the Order of Australia for service to Paralympic athletics

References

Australian athletics coaches
Paralympic coaches of Australia
Paralympic athletics (track and field) coaches
Coaches at the 2004 Summer Paralympics
Coaches at the 2008 Summer Paralympics
Coaches at the 2012 Summer Paralympics
Coaches at the 2016 Summer Paralympics
Coaches at the 2020 Summer Paralympics
Australian Institute of Sport coaches
Recipients of the Medal of the Order of Australia
Living people
1958 births